Philoglossa is a genus of South American plants in the tribe Liabeae within the family Asteraceae.

 Species
 Philoglossa mimuloides (Hieron.) H.Rob. & Cuatrec. - Ecuador, Peru, Bolivia
 Philoglossa peruviana DC. - Peru

References

External links
 iSpot Nature, Tony Rebelo, Observations, yellow daisy, Philoglossa mimuloides photo

Liabeae
Flora of South America
Asteraceae genera